"I Swear" is a song written by Gary Baker and Frank J. Myers that became a hit for American country music artist John Michael Montgomery in 1993, and for American R&B group All-4-One in 1994.

Released in November 1993 as the lead single from his album Kickin' It Up, and accompanied by a music video directed by Marc Ball, Montogemery's version spent four weeks at number-one on the U.S. Hot Country Singles & Tracks chart, later crossing over to pop radio and reaching number 42 on the US Billboard Hot 100 in March.

The cover by All-4-One was subsequently released in April 1994, becoming a number-one hit in numerous countries, and later garnering a spot in Billboards ranking of All-Time Top 100 Songs.

Content
The song is a ballad in which the narrator promises his significant other that he will always love her.

Track listings
 CD maxi—United States (1993)'''
 "I Swear" – 4:23
 "Line on Love" – 2:37
 "Dream on Texas Ladies" – 3:08
 "Friday at Five" – 2:41

Charts

Weekly charts

Year-end charts

All-4-One version

Following the release of Montgomery's version, American male R&B pop group All-4-One recorded a cover version with record producer David Foster for their eponymous 1994 debut album. The cover includes a lyric change: the original line from the second verse "And when there's silver in your hair" was replaced by "And when just the two of us are there."

All-4-One's version reached number one on numerous music charts, including the US Billboard Hot 100, where it remained for 11 consecutive weeks. The recording later ranked number 98 on Billboards list of All-Time Top 100 Songs. In the United Kingdom, the All-4-One recording spent a total of 18 weeks on the UK Singles Chart, peaking at number two, where it stayed for seven consecutive weeks (held off the top spot by Wet Wet Wet's "Love Is All Around").

Background and composition
After their first album had finished going through the mastering process of recording, Doug Morris, president of Atlantic Records called the group for a meeting. He showed them the original "I Swear" country record, asking All-4-One to do a cover of it promising to bring David Foster in for production. Singer Jamie Jones of the group was most hesitant about releasing the song due to the genre crossover. The group finished the recording at Foster's Malibu home studio.

Critical reception
A reviewer from Billboard described the song as an "memorable anthem ballad". An editor, Larry Flick, wrote, "Follow-up to the gold-selling "So Much in Love" once again spotlights this male quartet's seamless harmonies. Producer David Foster supplies soft and pillowy synths, a caressing sax solo, and an overall splash of drama, which complements the unabashed romance of this hit-bound ballad. As teens enter prom season, expect this song to be the peak tune of the evening. Ahhh, young love ..." M.R. Martinez from Cash Box complimented it as a single "complete with shimmering vocals, swooning pop arrangements, and throttled (yet soulful) vocals". Dave Sholin from the Gavin Report complimented the producer that "polishes it up just right for pop audiences who, like their country counterparts, will soak in the lyrics." He added, "Those contemplating matrimony will no doubt have this played while they're walking down the aisle, and those who've already tied the knot might want to renew their vows just so they can make "I Swear" part of the ceremony." 

Chuck Campbell from Knoxville News Sentinel noted its "more modern (i.e. more syrupy)" take. In his weekly UK chart commentary, James Masterton wrote, "Labelled by many as this year's "End of the Road" you can see what all the hype is about. Four American teenagers singing in barber's shop harmonies makes for a gorgeous record. Whether it emulates its American success remains to be seen but Top 10 success is almost assured." Pan-European magazine Music & Media commented, "Since Whitney covered Dolly, Nashville is hip in the R&B milieu. Now the vocal harmony quartet halfway between Shai and Boyz II Men polishes John Michael Montgomery country number 1 hit." Alan Jones from Music Week declared it as a "pretty and powerful ballad", "[that] should be big".

Music video
A music video was produced to promote the single. It portrays the members of All-4-One hanging out on a rooftop singing interspersed with scenes with a young woman walking on the sidewalk below. They go down to walk and talk with her as they implore her not to leave. Ultimately, she says goodbye to each member before boarding a departing bus. The video was later published on YouTube in January 2014. It had generated over 57 million views as of September 20, 2021.

Other All-4-One versions
All-4-One and John Michael Montgomery recorded an updated duet version of "I Swear" for the deluxe edition of All-4-One's 2015 album Twenty+. A music video for this duet version was released on May 9, 2016. In 2021, All-4-One recorded a remix of "I Swear" for a music video promoting Xbox All-Access, titled "It's All There". A clip of the All-4-One has also been used in Gain laundry detergent TV ads in the US since 2021.

Track listings

 7-inch single "I Swear" (radio edit) – 3:43
 "I Swear" (radio remix) – 4:19

 CD single "I Swear" (radio edit) – 3:43
 "I Swear" (radio remix) – 4:19

 CD maxi' "I Swear" (radio edit) – 3:43
 "I Swear" (radio mix) – 4:18
 "I Swear" (radio remix) – 4:18
 "I Swear" (album version) – 4:18

Charts

Weekly charts

Year-end charts

Decade-end charts

All-time charts

Certifications

Release history

Other versions
The final eleven contestants from Popstars: Girls forever, ninth season of TV talent show POPSTARS'' in Germany, they released a cover version of the song with Gary Baker on November 19, 2010. The finalists premiered the song live on the November 18 edition of the program; the single was available for digital download on November 16, 2010, and a physical release followed the day after the live performance of the song. The song was recorded at Noiseblock Studios in Florence, Alabama. The cover reached number 69 on the German Singles Chart.

References

External links
 All-4-One - I Swear

1993 songs
1993 singles
1994 singles
2010 debut singles
All-4-One songs
Atlantic Records singles
Billboard Hot 100 number-one singles
Billboard Hot Country Songs number-one singles of the year
Contemporary R&B ballads
Country ballads
Dutch Top 40 number-one singles
John Michael Montgomery songs
Lotta Engberg songs
Number-one singles in Australia
Number-one singles in Austria
Number-one singles in Denmark
Number-one singles in Germany
Number-one singles in the Netherlands
Number-one singles in New Zealand
Number-one singles in Sweden
Number-one singles in Switzerland
Number-one singles in Zimbabwe
Pop ballads
RPM Top Singles number-one singles
Song recordings produced by David Foster
Song recordings produced by Scott Hendricks
Songs written by Frank J. Myers
Songs written by Gary Baker (songwriter)
Soul ballads
Warner Music Group singles
1990s ballads